The Lammerlaw Range is in the Otago region of New Zealand. It is an important watershed, and the source of many of the tributaries in the Taieri and lower Clutha River systems. The origins of the placename are Scottish. Windfarms have been sited in the area. The area includes distinctive geology including ribbon fens and peat habitats. The Lammerlaw and Lammermoor Ranges also include tussock grasslands. Parts of the ranges are in Te Papanui Conservation Park. The endangered Eldon's galaxias (Galaxias eldoni) is found in the range.

See also
Protected areas of New Zealand
Conservation parks of New Zealand

References

External links
 1949 aerial photograph of the Lammerlaw Range, National Library of NZ

Mountain ranges of Otago